James David Kane (11 May 1895 – 8 April 1964) was an Australian politician. He was the Labor member for East Toowoomba in the Legislative Assembly of Queensland from 1935 to 1938.

Kane died in 1964 and was buried in Nudgee Cemetery.

References

1895 births
1964 deaths
Members of the Queensland Legislative Assembly
People from Toowoomba
Burials at Nudgee Cemetery
Australian Labor Party members of the Parliament of Queensland
20th-century Australian politicians